The Divorcee is a 1917 American silent Western film directed by William Wolbert and starring Mary Anderson, Gayne Whitman and Pliny Goodfriend.

Cast
 Mary Anderson as Wanda Carson
 Gayne Whitman as Reverend Jerry Gerguson 
 Pliny Goodfriend as Sam Carson
 Jean Hathaway as Mrs. Pelham-Wilson

References

Bibliography
 John T. Weaver. Twenty Years of Silents, 1908-1928. Scarecrow Press, 1971.

External links
 

1917 films
1917 Western (genre) films
1910s English-language films
American black-and-white films
Vitagraph Studios films
Films directed by William Wolbert
Silent American Western (genre) films
1910s American films